The Dinner Falls is a mix of three waterfalls that display plunge, segmented and cascade characteristics on the upper Barron River located in the Far North  region of Queensland, Australia.

Location and features
The bottommost of the waterfall series is a long cascade fall; the middle section of the falls is a trio of segmented drops; while the uppermost section of the falls has a triangular shape as it plunges off the tableland plateau.

Access to the falls is via a walking track.

See also

 List of waterfalls of Queensland

References

  

Waterfalls of Far North Queensland
Tablelands Region
Cascade waterfalls
Plunge waterfalls
Segmented waterfalls